Drechsel  may refer to:

Persons with the surname
 Bernd Drechsel (born 1953), German athlete (wrestling)
 Gottfried Drechsel (1928–2009), East German functionary and politician
 Herwig Drechsel (born 1973), Austrian athlete (football)
 Jeremias Drechsel or Hieremias Drechsel or Jeremias Drexel (1581–1638), Jesuit writer
 Sammy Drechsel (1925–1986), German political comedian
 Thomas Drechsel (born 1987), German actor
 Viktor Drechsel (born 1960), Italian athlete (pole vault)

See also
 Drexel (disambiguation)